The 2016 Washington Democratic presidential caucuses were held on March 26, 2016, in the U.S. state of Washington as one of the Democratic Party's primaries ahead of the 2016 presidential election.

On the same day, Democratic caucuses were held in Alaska and Hawaii. While the Republican primary was later held on May 24, 2016.

Sanders overwhelmingly won the March 26 caucus which had about 230,000 participants, winning 72.7% of the state's legislative district delegates to Clinton's 27.1%, giving Sanders a net gain of 47 pledged delegates.

Later, the state also held a non-binding primary vote on May 24, in which Clinton received about 52% of the vote – although this has no actual bearing on the delegate count for the nomination.

Opinion polling

Results

Analysis
Sanders scored a landslide victory in the Washington caucus. His victory did not come as a huge surprise, since Seattle as a city had donated the most money per capita to the Bernie Sanders for President Campaign, and Washington state (particularly Seattle) has a history of electing more left-leaning politicians including other self-proclaimed socialists to office. Sanders won all counties in the state on the day of the caucus.

Clinton had lost the Washington caucus eight years earlier to Barack Obama.

At a rally in Wisconsin on March 26, Sanders told supporters "We knew from day one that politically we were going to have a hard time in the Deep South, but we knew things were going to improve when we headed west."
Clinton won the Washington Democratic Primary, but lost the caucus. The same was true with Nebraska. She won the Primary and lost the caucus. In both states, despite the primary being non-binding it had significantly higher turnout than the caucuses, fueling criticism that caucuses are undemocratic and a form of voter suppression. For the 2020 nominating process, Washington and Nebraska both replaced their caucuses with binding primaries to allocate the states' delegates.

See also
 2016 Washington Republican presidential primary

References

Washington
Democratic caucuses
2016